The slang phrase sorry not sorry refers sarcastically to a non-apology apology.

The title Sorry Not Sorry may refer to:

 "Sorry Not Sorry" (Bryson Tiller song), a single by American R&B singer Bryson Tiller from the 2016 album Trapsoul 
 "Sorry Not Sorry" (Demi Lovato song), a single by American pop singer Demi Lovato from the 2017 album Tell Me You Love Me
 "Sorry Not Sorry" (DJ Khaled song), a song by American producer DJ Khaled from his 2021 album Khaled Khaled
 "Sorry, Not Sorry", a song by American rock band Mayday Parade's from the 2013 album Monsters in the Closet
 "Sorry Not Sorry", a single by American alternative metal band Gemini Syndrome from the 2016 album, Memento Mori
 Sorry Not Sorry: Dreams, Mistakes, and Growing Up, a 2016 memoir by Naya Rivera
 Sorry Not Sorry a podcast hosted by American actress and activist Alyssa Milano
 "Sorry Not Sorry" (The Simpsons), a 2020 episode of The Simpsons